Pristimantis ruidus is a species of frog in the family Strabomantidae.
It is endemic to Ecuador.
Its natural habitats are tropical moist montane forests, pastureland, and heavily degraded former forest.

References

ruidus
Amphibians of Ecuador
Endemic fauna of Ecuador
Amphibians described in 1979
Taxonomy articles created by Polbot